On 3 June 2013, a fire at the Jilin Baoyuanfeng poultry processing plant in Mishazi, a town about  from Changchun, in Jilin province, People's Republic of China, killed at least 120 people. More than 60 others were hospitalised with injuries.

Plant

The poultry slaughterhouse was established by Jilin Baoyuanfeng Poultry Co. in 2009. It employed 1,200 people, but only 350 workers were believed to be on site at the time of the fire. Such plants typically have a coolant system that uses ammonia, a chemical believed to have caused the fire.

In October 2010, the head of the local anticorruption body of the Communist Party, Zhao Wenbo, said the company's "progress into becoming a nationally known enterprise and the growth of its production inspiring". It was "top 100 agricultural processing companies", while the provincial capital of Changchun labeled it a "leading enterprise" in agricultural industrialization, a title that it also held in 2011.

Fire
Just after dawn on 3 June 2013, three large explosions and an ensuing fire occurred at the plant. All but one door in the building were reportedly locked, which prevented workers from escaping the fire. At least 119 people were killed. According to local government officials, approximately 270 doctors and nurses along with more than 500 firefighters attended the scene to treat the injured and put out the fire. Roughly 100 workers escaped, around 60 of whom sustained minor injuries from the blaze.

The fire was extinguished by early afternoon. A suspected ammonia leak caused 3,000 residents living within a kilometre of the site to be evacuated. Some early reports attributed the cause of the fire to this leak, but others suggested an electrical fault was to blame. The fire is believed to be the worst nationwide since the 2000 Luoyang Christmas fire in Luoyang, Henan.

Reactions
CPC General Secretary, President Xi Jinping and Premier Li Keqiang "ordered every effort to go into the rescue operation" and stated that the "investigation into the cause of the accident would be vigorous".

See also
2010 Shanghai fire
Hamlet chicken processing plant fire

References

fire
2013 fires in Asia
Fire disasters involving barricaded escape routes
Fires in China
Industrial fires
Industrial fires and explosions in China
June 2013 events in China